This is a list of amphibians found in Honduras. 121 amphibian species have been registered in Honduras, which are grouped in three orders: Caecilians (Gymnophiona), salamanders (Caudata) and frogs and toads (Anura). This list is derived from the database listing of AmphibiaWeb and IUCN Red List.

Caecilians (Gymnophiona)

Caeciliidae 
Order: Gymnophiona – Family: Caeciliidae
Dermophis mexicanus (VU)
Gymnopis multiplicata (LC)

Salamanders (Caudata)

Plethodontidae 
Order: Caudata – Family: Plethodontidae
Bolitoglossa carri (CR)
Bolitoglossa cataguana	
Bolitoglossa celaque (EN)
Bolitoglossa conanti (EN)
Bolitoglossa decora (CR)
Bolitoglossa diaphora (CR)
Bolitoglossa dofleini (NT)
Bolitoglossa dunni (EN)
Bolitoglossa heiroreias (EN)
Bolitoglossa longissima (CR)
Bolitoglossa mexicana (LC)
Bolitoglossa oresbia (CR)
Bolitoglossa porrasorum (EN)
Bolitoglossa rufescens (LC)
Bolitoglossa striatula (LC)
Bolitoglossa synoria (CR)
Cryptotriton nasalis (EN)
Dendrotriton sanctibarbarus (VU)
Nototriton barbouri (EN)
Nototriton brodiei (CR)
Nototriton lignicola (CR)
Nototriton limnospectator (EN)
Nototriton picucha	
Nototriton tomamorum	
Oedipina cyclocauda (LC)
Oedipina elongata (LC)
Oedipina gephyra (EN)
Oedipina kasios	
Oedipina leptopoda	
Oedipina petiola	
Oedipina quadra	
Oedipina stuarti (DD)
Oedipina tomasi (CR)

Toads and frogs (Anura)

Bufonidae 
Order: Anura – Family: Bufonidae
Incilius campbelli (NT)
Incilius coccifer (LC)
Incilius ibarrai (EN)
Incilius leucomyos (EN)
Incilius luetkenii (LC)
Incilius porteri (DD)
Incilius valliceps (LC)
Rhaebo haematiticus (LC)
Rhinella chrysophora (EN)
Rhinella marina (LC)

Centrolenidae 
Order: Anura – Family: Centrolenidae
Cochranella granulosa (LC)
Hyalinobatrachium chirripoi (LC)
Hyalinobatrachium colymbiphyllum (LC)
Hyalinobatrachium fleischmanni (LC)
Teratohyla pulverata (LC)
Teratohyla spinosa (LC)

Craugastoridae 
Order: Anura – Family: Craugastoridae
Craugastor anciano (CR)
Craugastor aurilegulus (EN)
Craugastor bransfordii (LC)
Craugastor chac (NT)
Craugastor chrysozetetes (EX)
Craugastor coffeus (CR)
Craugastor cyanochthebius (NT)
Craugastor emleni (CR)
Craugastor epochthidius (CR)
Craugastor fecundus (CR)
Craugastor fitzingeri (LC)
Craugastor laevissimus (EN)
Craugastor laticeps (NT)
Craugastor lauraster (EN)
Craugastor megacephalus (LC)
Craugastor merendonensis (CR)
Craugastor milesi (CR)
Craugastor noblei (LC)
Craugastor olanchano (CR)
Craugastor omoaensis (CR)
Craugastor pechorum (EN)
Craugastor rhodopis (VU)
Craugastor rostralis (NT)
Craugastor saltuarius (CR)
Craugastor stadelmani (CR)

Eleutherodactylidae
Order: Anura – Family: Eleutherodactylidae
Greenhouse frog, Eleutherodactylus planirostris (LC)

Hylidae 
Order: Anura – Family: Hylidae
Agalychnis callidryas (LC)
Agalychnis moreletii (CR)
Anotheca spinosa (LC)
Bromeliohyla bromeliacia (EN)
Dendropsophus microcephalus (LC)
Duellmanohyla salvavida (CR)
Duellmanohyla soralia (CR)
Ecnomiohyla minera (EN)
Ecnomiohyla salvaje (CR)
Exerodonta catracha (EN)
Hyla melacaena (NT)
Hypsiboas crepitans (LC)
Isthmohyla insolita (CR)
Plectrohyla chrysopleura (CR)
Plectrohyla dasypus (CR)
Plectrohyla exquisita (CR)
Plectrohyla glandulosa (EN)
Plectrohyla guatemalensis (CR)
Plectrohyla hartwegi (CR)
Plectrohyla psiloderma (EN)
Plectrohyla teuchestes (CR)
Ptychohyla hypomykter (CR)
Ptychohyla salvadorensis (EN)
Ptychohyla spinipollex (EN)
Scinax staufferi (LC)
Smilisca baudinii (LC)
Smilisca sordida (LC)
Tlalocohyla loquax (LC)
Tlalocohyla picta (LC)
Trachycephalus venulosus (LC)
Triprion petasatus (LC)

Leptodactylidae 
Order: Anura – Family: Leptodactylidae
Engystomops pustulosus (LC)
Leptodactylus fragilis (LC)
Leptodactylus melanonotus (LC)
Leptodactylus savagei (LC)
Leptodactylus silvanimbus (CR)

Microhylidae
Order: Anura – Family: Microhylidae
Gastrophryne elegans 
Northern sheep frog, Hypopachus variolosus

Ranidae
Order: Anura – Family: Ranidae
Rio Grande leopard frog, Lithobates berlandieri 
Highland frog, Lithobates maculatus 
Vaillant's frog, Lithobates vaillanti 
Warszewitsch's frog, Lithobates warszewitschii

Rhinophrynidae
Order: Anura – Family: Rhinophrynidae
Mexican burrowing toad, Rhinophrynus dorsalis

Strabomantidae
Order: Anura – Family: Strabomantidae
Pristimantis ridens

Notes

References

 
Amphibians
Honduras
Honduras